Saint-Pardoux-Soutiers is a commune in the Deux-Sèvres department in western France. It was established on 1 January 2019 by merger of the former communes of Saint-Pardoux (the seat) and Soutiers.

See also
Communes of the Deux-Sèvres department

References

Saintpardouxsoutiers